Bror Vingren (20 March 1906 – 14 September 1980) was a Swedish wrestler. He competed in the men's freestyle bantamweight at the 1932 Summer Olympics.

References

External links
 

1906 births
1980 deaths
Swedish male sport wrestlers
Olympic wrestlers of Sweden
Wrestlers at the 1932 Summer Olympics
People from Staffanstorp Municipality
Sportspeople from Skåne County
20th-century Swedish people